This is a partial list of neighbourhoods in Bangkok.

Bang Kapi
Bang Kapi
Chok Chai 4
Happy Land
Hua Mak
Khlong Chan
Lam Sali
Lat Phrao
Ramkhamhaeng

Bang Sue
Bang Pho
Bang Son
Bang Sue
Pracha Chuen
Tao Pun
Wong Sawang

Chatuchak

Ari
Chatuchak Park
Chorakhe Bua
Chumtang Bang Sue
Kamphaeng Phet
Lat Phrao
Mo Chit
Phahon Yothin
Pradiphat
Ratchayothin
Saphan Khwai
Wat Samian Nari

Don Mueang
Bang Khen
Don Mueang
Kaset-Nawamin
Lak Si
Lat Pla Khao
Ngam Wong Wan
Saphan Mai
Sena Nikhom
Thung Song Hong

Dusit
Bang Krabue
Lan Phra Borommarup Song Ma
Kiak Kai
Maha Nak
Ratchawat
Samsen
Si Yan
Soi Suan Oi

Pathum Wan (well known as Ratchaprasong shopping street area)

Ban Krua
Banthat Thong
Bon Kai
Charoen Phon
Chit Lom
Chula
Hua Lamphong
Lang Suan
Suphachalasai (National Stadium)
Phloen Chit
Phra Ram 1
Ratchadamri
Ratchaprasong
Sam Yan
Saphan Lueang
Siam Square (Shinjuku of Thailand)
Suan Luang
Suan Lum
Witthayu

Phetchaburi

Indra
Khlong Tan
Makkasan
Pantip Plaza
Phet Rama
Pratu Nam
Ratchaprarop
Yommarat
Uruphong

Phra Nakhon (well known as Rattanakosin Island)

Ban Mo
Bang Lamphu
Khaosan Road
Khlong Lot
Khok Wua
Pak Khlong Talat
Pratu Phi
Ratchadamnoen
Saphan Phut (Memorial Bridge)
Sam Phraeng
Sanam Luang
Sao Chingcha
Si Kak
Tha Phra Chan
Tha Tian
Thewet

Pom Prap Sattru Phai
Ban Bat
Bobae
Lan Luang
Maen Si
Nang Loeng
Saphan Khao
Suan Mali
Suea Pa
Wong Wian Yi Sip Song Karakada Khom
Worachak
Yotse

Ratchadaphisek or Ratchada

Chan Kasem
Din Daeng
Huai Khwang
Meng Jai
Phra Ram 9
Pracha Songkhro
Sutthisan (Inthamara)
RCA
Thailand Cultural Centre
Town in Town

Sathon

Chong Nonsi
Lumphini
Naradhiwas Rajanagarindra
Phra Ram 3
Saphan Taksin
Sathu Pradit
Surasak
Thanon Chan
Thanon Tok
Yan Nawa

Si Lom

Bang Rak
Patpong
Sala Daeng
Silom
Si Phraya
Soi Lalai Sap
Surawong
Thaniya

Sri Nakarin
Bang Na
Bearing
BITEC (Bangkok International Trade & Exhibition Centre)
Krungthep Kritha
Lasalle
Nong Bon
Phatthanakan
Suan Luang
Wat Si Iam

Sukhumvit

Asok
Ekkamai
Khlong Toei
Kluai Nam Thai
Nana
On Nut
Phra Khanong
Phra Ram 4
Phrom Phong
Queen Sirikit Center
Thong Lo
Udom Suk

Thon Buri

Ban Khaek
Ban Khamin
Bang Kradi
Ban Noen
Bang Bon
Bang Khae
Bang Khun Non
Bang Khun Thian
Bang Mot
Bang Pakaeo
Bang Pakok
Bang Phai
Bang Wa
Bang Kradi
Bukkhalo
Charan Sanit Wong
Charoen Nakhon
Charoen Rat
Dao Khanong
Faichai
Hua Krabue
Khlong Khwang
Khlong San
Kudi Chin
Lak Song
Nong Khaem
Pho Sam Ton
Phran Nok
Phra Ram 2
Pinklao
Phuttha Bucha
Phutthamonthon
Rat Burana
Ratchaphruek
Samre
Sanam Luang 2
Siri Rat
Talat Phlu
Taling Chan
Tha Din Daeng
Tha Phra
Thung Khru
Wat Arun
Wang Lang
Wong Wian Lek
Wong Wian Yai

Victory Monument

Phaya Thai
Ramathibodi
Ratchathewi
Ratchawithi
Sam Liam Din Daeng
Sanam Pao

Wang Burapha
Khlong Thom
Phahurat (Little India of Bangkok)
Sam Yot
Saphan Lek
Wang Burapha
Woeng Nakhon Kasem (Thieves' Market)

Yaowarat (Chinatown of Bangkok)
Phlapphla Chai
Ratchawong
Sampheng
Song Wat
Sam Yaek
Saphan Han
Sieng Kong
Talat Noi
Yaowarat

See also
Bangkok
Bangkok MRT
Bangkok Mass Transit System (BTS)
List of shopping malls in Thailand
Downtown
Central business district
List of leading shopping streets and districts by city

References 

Geography of Bangkok
Bangkok districts
Districts